New York's 66th State Assembly district is one of 150 districts of the New York State Assembly. It is currently represented by Assemblywoman Deborah Glick (D).

Geography 
District 66 is located in southwestern Manhattan, comprising the neighborhood of Greenwich Village, Tribeca, SoHo, NoHo,as well as a small portion of Battery Park City and the Meatpacking District.

Recent election results

2022

2020

2018

2016

2014

2012

2010

Past Assemblypersons
 Deborah Glick (1992–present)
 John Ravitz (1991–1992)
 Mark Alan Siegel (1975–91)
 Antonio G. Olivieri (1971–1975)
 Stephen C. Hansen (1969–1970)
 S. William Green (1965–1968)
 Louis DeSalvio (1965)

References

66